"Things Can Only Get Better" is a song by Northern Irish musical group D:Ream, released in 1993 as the second single from their debut album, D:Ream On Volume 1 (1993). It took several months to reach the top of the UK Singles Chart. Originally a club hit, pop success took much longer for the song—initially, it reached only number 24 on the chart in January 1993. Band member Al Mackenzie left later that year, and remaining member Peter Cunnah took the band in a more pop-friendly direction.

"Things Can Only Get Better" was remixed and became a bigger hit, spending four weeks at number one in January 1994, after the band had been supporting Take That on their UK tour. In addition, the song managed to reach the top 10 in eight countries. In the US, it peaked at number seven on the Billboard Hot Dance Club Play chart. The UK Labour Party used the song as a theme during the party's successful campaign in the general election of 1997.

Background and release

D:Ream's frontman Peter Cunnah used to be in an indie guitar band called Tie the Boy in Derry, Northern Ireland. After a move to London and a deal with the label Mother Records that went cold, the band broke up. Cunnah stayed in London, working three years in clubs. He also had an office job, but all he really wanted was to become a pop star. One day he was a bit teary about it, one of the office girls said, "Don't worry. Things can only get better." Right there he got the idea for the song and some help from Jamie Petrie, who wrote some of the lyrics. However, the song just ended up on Cunnah's stockpile of 300 unrecorded tunes. Two years later, after Cunnah had started the new band D:Ream with Alan Mackenzie, they were working on a track and then "Things Can Only Get Better" came back into Cunnah's head. It took a year to get the song right and producer Tom Frederikse built it up with choirs until it sounded like a stadium full of people singing. This time, the single reached number 24 on the UK Singles Chart. Now they wanted to go in different directions, so Mackenzie left the band. 

According to Mackenzie, "Things Can Only Get Better" was first released as a 10-minute instrumental EP with a reggae break. The subsequent single version originally had a gospel-type a cappella intro, but the record company cut it off. Mackenzie objected, saying that it was crucial to the song, so when the song was remixed, it was reinstated in the song. In 1994, the remix sold 600,000 copies and spent four weeks at number one on the UK Singles Chart. The single also reached the top 10 in eight other countries. The Labour Party's central use of the song in their successful 1997 campaign led the song to appear on the UK Singles Chart for a third time.

Chart performance
"Things Can Only Get Better" was originally a club hit, reaching number 24 in the UK in January 1993. Eleven months later, in December, the song was re-released in a new remix after a stint supporting Take That on their UK tour significantly raised D:Ream's profile. It then reached number one on the UK Singles Chart on 16 January 1994, spending four weeks at the top and also topped the UK Dance Singles Chart. In Europe, the song entered the top 10 also in Belgium (10), Finland (2), Iceland (4), Ireland (2), and Sweden (7). Additionally, it was a top 20 hit in Denmark (19), Germany (20), the Netherlands (20) and Scotland (17). On the Eurochart Hot 100, "Things Can Only Get Better" reached number five in February 1994. 

Outside Europe, the song peaked at number three in Israel, and number nine in Australia. In the US, the 1994 version peaked at number seven on the Billboard Hot Dance Club Play chart. It was awarded a gold record in Australia after 35,000 units were sold.

Critical reception
Scottish Aberdeen Evening Express complimented the song as "incredibly catchy". Larry Flick from Billboard described it as a "radio-friendly ditty that blends an insinuating groove with rollicking gospel chants and a wildly infectious pop melody. Track builds to a fitting, anthemic musical climax that is complemented by choir vocals and heartfelt lead belting." Simon Warner from The Guardian declared it as "the sort of insistent pop anthem that comes along only once in a while." Irish Evening Herald called it a "prophetic anthem". Tom Ewing of Freaky Trigger described it as "tune-heavy, hands-high dance-pop". An editor from Melody Maker declared it as an "infectious, euphoric anthem". Pan-European magazine Music & Media called it a "poppy rave anthem" and concluded that "this optimistic perspective on life deserves your support." Andy Beevers from Music Week named it as a "stand-out tune" and a "tuneful, epic house track". 

John Kilgo from The Network Forty felt the house approach gives this tune "a cutting edge feel." He explained, "D:Ream sends a positive message to disenchanted youth. Featuring powerful vibes flavored by techno bass thumps as well as Peter Cunnah's searing harmonies, this record will stir up the request lines for months. Encompassing the best of dance, rock, and alternative, D:Ream hits a home run." In an retrospective review, Pop Rescue complimented its "funky saxophone, a relentlessly thumping bass drum, house piano and Peter’s strong vocals." The reviewer stated that "it’s still a bloody good song". James Hamilton from the RM Dance Update described it as a "infectious" and "jiggly chugger". Adam Higginbotham from Select deemed it a "perfect feelgood pop-dance record". Leesa Daniels from Smash Hits gave it five out of five, stating that D:Ream "are the best dance act this side of the moon and it's a crime that they're not as big as M People already with all their fab dancey tunes. Stick it on, stick it out and let 'em down. Just watch the elastic on your knickers burst with the sheer excitement of it all. Bloomin' marvellous."

Music video
The accompanying music video for "Things Can Only Get Better" was directed by British film and music video director James Lebon. It depicts the band performing the song in front of a backdrop of various scenes and images, such as art, burning flames and skies. In between, they are performing on stage in front of a dancing audience. A young female sometimes appears. The chorus scenes shows Cunnah in front of a large white-clad choir in a heaven-like setting, singing and clapping in unison. Both the opening and the closing depicts a stage curtain that opens and closes in front of Cunnah. The video was A-listed on Germany's VIVA in March 1994 and was nominated for the International Viewer's Choice Award for MTV Europe at the 1994 MTV Europe Music Awards.

Track listings
 CD maxi, Europe (first 1993 release)
"Things Can Only Get Better" (7-inch D:reamix) – 3:23
"Things Can Only Get Better" (12-inch D:reamix) – 7:10
"Things Can Only Get Better" (12-inch vocal dub) – 8:00
"Things Can Only Get Better" (12-inch instrumental) – 6:10
"Things Can Only Get Better" (12-inch Danny Rampling mix) – 5:55

 CD maxi, Europe (second 1993 release)
"Things Can Only Get Better" (D·Reamix edit) – 4:01
"Things Can Only Get Better" (12-inch D·Reamix) – 7:04
"Things Can Only Get Better" (Cleveland City Style) – 6:15
"Things Can Only Get Better" (Superfly Development vocal) – 5:58
"Things Can Only Get Better" (Cleveland Main Vocal) – 6:32
"Things Can Only Get Better" 8Cleveland Euro Style) – 5:58

 CD maxi, Europe (1997)
"Things Can Only Get Better" (D:reamix edit) – 3:59
"Things Can Only Get Better" (D:reamix '97 edit) – 4:06
"Things Can Only Get Better" (12-inch D:reamix) – 7:03
"Things Can Only Get Better" (12-inch D:reamix '97) – 8:14
"Things Can Only Get Better" (Cleveland City Style) – 6:14
"Things Can Only Get Better" (Superfly Development vocal) – 5:59

 Digital download (2014)
"Things Can Only Get Better" (D·Reamix edit) – 4:01

Charts

Weekly charts

Year-end charts

Certifications

Release history

In popular culture

As a campaign song
During the 1997 United Kingdom general election, the Labour Party adopted the song as their campaign theme (the title claiming that things "cannot get worse"). Having spent eighteen years as the Opposition, the song was seen as reflective of the new direction of the party under Tony Blair. Rather than the older, traditional Labour Party values, the creation of New Labour was hoped to be a dynamic and dramatic enough ideological switch that it would attract voters across party political lines and result in the removal of the Conservative Party from Government.

The song's usage returned it to the chart, reaching number 19 in May 1997, when Labour returned to power with Blair as Prime Minister, replacing John Major with one of the biggest landslides in British political history.

John O'Farrell used the song title as the title of his book about Labour's 18 years in opposition. Later, lead singer Peter Cunnah admitted mixed feelings about the use of the song as part of the election campaign.

Other
In February 1998, the song was featured in an episode of Top Gear, during the review of the Toyota Avensis, with a voice-over by presenter Jeremy Clarkson.

In 2013, the song was adopted as a chant by fans of Sunderland A.F.C., after the teams revival under manager Gus Poyet. Supporters of Sunderland launched a campaign to get the song back into the chart, to coincide with their team's Capital One Cup Final on 2 March 2014 at Wembley Stadium. On 3 March 2014, the song re entered in the UK Dance Chart at number 19. Mackenzie described the resurgence to a Sunderland website as "a bit bizarre" but he was "revelling in it"

In an interview on the television programme Charlie Brooker's 2016 Wipe, D:Ream's keyboardist-turned-physicist Brian Cox reflected on the song during a discussion about the destruction and incineration of Earth by the sun, calling it "one of the most misleading and scientifically inaccurate pop songs that's ever been written". A running gag on The Infinite Monkey Cage, which Cox co-presents, highlights that the lyric "Things Can Only Get Better" violates the second law of thermodynamics.

References

1993 songs
1993 singles
D Ream songs
1997 United Kingdom general election
Magnet Records singles
Music Week number-one dance singles
New Labour
Songs written by Peter Cunnah
UK Singles Chart number-one singles
Political party songs
Tony Blair